David Brian Hargrove (born April 2) is an American television writer and producer. He was a co-creator of the television series Titus (2000–2002), along with Christopher Titus and Jack Kenny.

Early life and education
Born David Brian Hargrove in Tarboro, North Carolina, he earned his BFA degree from the University of North Carolina at Chapel Hill. He then studied acting at New York City's Juilliard School as a member of the drama division's Group 10 (1977–1981).

Career
Hargrove is the creator and producer of many television shows, including Titus, Wanda at Large, and Nora. He also has written for several television series, including Dave's World, Caroline in the City, Holding the Baby, and Maggie.

Hargrove wrote the book and lyrics for the new musical, It Shoulda Been You, which opened on Broadway in March 2015 (previews). It is directed by David Hyde Pierce.

Personal life
Hargrove married long-time partner, actor and comedian David Hyde Pierce, on October 24, 2008. They have been together since the early 1980s.

Television credits
 The Secret World of Alex Mack (1994–1995: writer)
 Dave's World (1994–1996: story editor, writer, actor)
 Caroline in the City (1996–1998: producer, writer, actor)
 Maggie (1998: supervising producer)
 Holding the Baby (1998: supervising producer, writer)
 Titus (2000–2002: co-creator, composer, executive producer, director, actor)
 Wanda at Large (2003: executive producer, writer)

References

External links
 

1956 births
Living people
American television producers
American television writers
Juilliard School alumni
American LGBT screenwriters
LGBT people from North Carolina
American male television writers
People from Tarboro, North Carolina
University of North Carolina at Chapel Hill alumni
Screenwriters from North Carolina
21st-century LGBT people